X is the tenth LP album released 1983 by the Danish rock band Gnags. The album was released digitally remastered in 1995 on CD.

Track listing 
 Fodgænger — 4:03
 Slingrer ned ad Vestergade — 4:13
 Fuldmånen Lyser — 3:45
 Forvandlingskugler — 3:22
 Tossefugle — 3:44
 Havnen med Skibe — 3:36
 Tømmerflåden — 4:11
 Zebrafinken — 2:52
 Fuldmånevandvid — 4:03
 Alt Synes Ro Ombord — 3:12

1983 albums
Gnags albums